Siraj-ud-Din Ali Khan (1687-1756), also known by his pen-name Arzu, was a Delhi-based poet, linguist and lexicographer of the Mughal Empire. He used to write mainly in Persian, but he also wrote 127 couplets in Urdu. He was the maternal-uncle of Mir Taqi Mir. He taught Mir Taqi Mir, Mirza Muhammad Rafi Sauda, Mirza Mazhar Jan-e-Janaan and Najm-ud-Din Shah Mubarak Abroo.

Arzu was born in Agra. He was the son of Sheikh Hisam-ud-Din, a soldier who held many high offices in the court of the Mughal emperor Aurangzeb. He was highly proficient in Persian and Arabic, the two languages which he learned as a child. He also learned Urdu and Sanskrit.

Arzu started writing at the age of fourteen, and came to Delhi in 1719. He was introduced to Nawab Qamar-ud-din Khan by Anand Ram 'Mukhlis'. Qamar-ud-Din, who was the prime minister at that time, gave him a suitable job. Arzu used to hold mushairas at his home, and attracted many disciples including Mir Taqi Mir. In 1751, he wrote an Urdu-Persian dictionary called the Navadirul Alfaz. He migrated to Lucknow in 1754, and subsequently to Ayodhya, which was once the residence of his great-grandfather. He died in Lucknow in 1756, and was buried in the Vakilpura area of Delhi.

Literary works 

Arzu's works include:

 Siraj-ul-Lughat (a lexicon of Persian which also discusses the relationship between Persian and Sanskrit)
 Chiragh-e-Hidayat (a glossary of words and idioms used by the Persian poets)
 Nawadir-ul-Alfaz (a glossary of Indic words)
 Several ghazals and qasidas
 Diwan-e-Asar Shirazi
 Mohibbat-e-Uzma (a treatise on prosody)
 Atiya-e-Kubra (another work on prosody)
 Miyar-ul-Afkar (a treatise on grammar)
 Payam-i-Shauq (a collection of letters), 
 Josh-o-Kharosh (masnavi)
 Mehr-o-Mah
 Ibrat Fasana
 Gulzar-i Khayal (a long poem on Holi and the coming of the spring)

See also 
 Persian language in South Asia

References 

1687 births
1756 deaths
People from Agra
18th-century Persian-language writers
Urdu-language poets from India
Indian lexicographers
Urdu-language writers from Mughal India
17th-century Urdu-language writers
18th-century Urdu-language writers
Urdu-language writers from British India
18th-century Indian poets
Poets from Uttar Pradesh
18th-century lexicographers